(born October 20, 1967) is a Japanese former professional motorcycle road racer and development rider. He was All-Japan Superbike champion in 2001. He was also runner-up in 1996 and third in 1999, part of a long run of top-10 series finishes. He finished 3rd in the Suzuka 8 Hours race in 1997, teamed with Shinja Takeishi. He and Keiichi Kitagawa came 2nd there in 2000. As of 2006 he is a factory test rider for Suzuki.

Racing fans outside Japan will know him for his regular wild card entries into international championships, primarily in the Japanese rounds. He was the main development rider for Suzuki's GSV-R MotoGP bike, and raced in several times in 2002 and 2003. He nearly caused a major upset at the 2002 Japanese Grand Prix by leading for much of the race, before finishing second to Valentino Rossi.

Career statistics

Superbike World Championship

Races by year
(key) (Races in bold indicate pole position) (Races in italics indicate fastest lap)

Grand Prix motorcycle racing

Races by year
(key) (Races in bold indicate pole position, races in italics indicate fastest lap)

References

External links

 Crash.net profile

1967 births
Living people
Sportspeople from Hyōgo Prefecture
Japanese motorcycle racers
Superbike World Championship riders
Suzuki MotoGP riders
MotoGP World Championship riders
500cc World Championship riders